Creme Yvette, also called Creme d'Yvette or Creme de Yvette, is a proprietary liqueur made from parma violet petals with blackberries, red raspberries, wild strawberries and cassis, honey, orange peel and vanilla. It was once manufactured by Charles Jacquin et Cie in Philadelphia, Pennsylvania, who purchased the brand formerly made by Sheffield Company of Connecticut.  It became almost impossible to find after production stopped in 1969.  The liqueur was, however, recently resurrected by Rob Cooper, the creator of St-Germain elderflower liqueur.

In the fall of 2009, 40 years after it stopped production, Charles Jacquin et Cie revived the liqueur. 

According to Martha Stewart's Living magazine, March 2010, "Creme Yvette, a 100-year-old violet liqueur, has been rereleased. Blending fresh berries, vanilla, spices, and violet petals, the purple liqueur has an understated sweetness that really comes alive when mixed with sparkling wine." 

Most drinks calling for Creme Yvette can be made using creme de violette.

References

 Vintage Violet Cocktails Make a Comeback - Smithsonian.com
 Violets popping up all over this season - by Lauren Viera, Chicago Tribune

Liqueurs